Britannia is a series of television documentaries by BBC Four that began in 2005. The documentaries mostly deal with the evolution of a music genre or other aspect of musical culture over a period of several decades within the United Kingdom, although some episodes have covered music in other countries (Ireland, the United States, Italy) or such diverse subjects as comic books, games, satirical literature, and wildlife. The programmes are usually presented in a three-episode format, but are often broadcast as one continuous block as part of a schedule of themed programming.

Episodes

Jazz Britannia

A look at the history of British jazz music. Presented by Terence Stamp.

Folk Britannia
A look at the history of British folk music.

Classic Britannia

A look at the history of British classical music.

Soul Britannia

A look at the history of British soul music. Presented by Pauline Black.

Comics Britannia

A look at the history of British comics. Presented by Armando Iannucci.

Dance Britannia

A look at the history of British dance culture.

Pop Britannia

A look at the history of British pop music. Presented by Anne-Marie Duff.

Folk Hibernia

A look at the history of Irish folk music.

Prog Rock Britannia: An Observation in Three Movements
A look at the history of British progressive rock music in the 1970s. Presented by Nigel Planer and featuring interviews with Joe Boyd, Arthur Brown, Gary Brooker, Robert Wyatt, Bill Bruford, Mike Oldfield, Bob Harris, Jonathan Coe, Steve Howe, Carl Palmer, Rick Wakeman, Pete Sinfield, Richard Coughlan, Mont Campbell, Phil Collins, Mike Rutherford, Tony Banks, Ian Anderson and Roger Dean.

Folk America

A look at the history of American folk music. Presented by Bernard Hill.

Blues Britannia: Can Blue Men Sing the Whites?
A look at the history of British blues music. Presented by Nigel Planer and featuring interviews with Keith Richards, Jack Bruce, Chris Dreja, Chris Barber, Bill Wyman, Mick Fleetwood, Tony McPhee, Dave Kelly, Tom McGuinness, Paul Jones, Mike Vernon, Ian Anderson, John Mayall, Pete Brown, Val Wilmer, Phil Ryan, Champion Jack Dupree (archived), Bob Brunning, Phil May, Dick Taylor and Mick Abrahams.

Synth Britannia
A look at the history of British synthesizer-based electronic music. Featuring interviews with Richard H. Kirk, Bernard Sumner, Philip Oakey, Simon Reynolds, Wolfgang Flür, Andy McCluskey, Martyn Ware, Daniel Miller, Paul Humphreys, John Foxx, Cosey Fanni Tutti, Chris Carter, Gary Numan, Susanne Sulley, Joanne Catherall, Martin Gore, Vince Clarke, Andrew Fletcher, Dave Ball, Alison Moyet, Midge Ure, Neil Tennant and Chris Lowe.

Games Britannia

A look at the history of the British games industry. Presented by Benjamin Woolley.

Metal Britannia

A look at the history of British heavy metal music. Presented by Nigel Planer.

Opera Italia

A look at the history of Italian opera music. Presented by Antonio Pappano.

Rude Britannia

A look at the history of British satire. Presented by Julian Rhind-Tutt.

Birds Britannia

A look at the history of British birds. Presented by Bill Paterson.

Festivals Britannia

A look at the history of British music festivals.

Reggae Britannia
A look at the history of British reggae music. Presented by Ruby Turner and featuring interviews with Dennis Bovell, Boy George, Ali Campbell, Jerry Dammers, Don Letts, Dave Barker, Paul Weller, Paul Simonon, Prince Buster, Max Romeo, Pauline Black, Chris Blackwell, Sugar Minott, Bunny Lee, Bob Andy, Kentrick Patrick, Steve Barrow, Bigga Morrison, Brinsley Forde, David Hinds, Linton Kwesi Johnson, Sylvia Tella, Astro, Big Youth, Al Capone, Tippa Irie, Robin Campbell, Wayne Perkins, John "Rabbit" Bundrick, Mykaell Riley, Viv Albertine, Stewart Copeland, Andy Summers, Rhoda Dakar, James Brown, Neville Staple, Rico Rodriguez, Winston Reedy, Carroll Thompson, Janet Kay, Smiley Culture, Jazzie B and Caron Wheeler.

Mixed Britannia

A look at the history of the British mixed-race population. Presented by George Alagiah.

Punk Britannia

A look at the history of British punk music. Presented by Peter Capaldi.

Pop Charts Britannia: 60 Years of the Top 10

A look at the history of the UK Singles Chart.

50s Britannia
A look at British rock and jazz music in the pre-Beatles era. Presented by Roger McGough.

Psychedelic Britannia
A trip through the most visionary period in British music history - five kaleidoscopic years between 1965 and 1970, when a handful of dreamers reimagined pop music. Presented by Nigel Planer. Originally broadcast 23 October 2015.

References

Bibliography
Tim Wall & Paul Long (2009). 'Jazz Britannia: Mediating the story of British jazz on television', Jazz Research Journal, 3(2):145-‐170. 
Paul Long & Tim Wall (2010). 'Mediating Popular Music Heritage: British television's narratives of popular music's past' in Ian Inglis (ed.), Popular Music on British Television, Ashgate.

BBC television documentaries
Documentary television series about music
Lists of British non-fiction television series episodes
Lists of documentaries